Malcolm-Jamal Warner (born August 18, 1970) is an American actor. He rose to prominence for his role as Theodore Huxtable on the NBC sitcom The Cosby Show, which earned him a nomination for Outstanding Supporting Actor in a Comedy Series at the 38th Primetime Emmy Awards. He is also known for his roles as Malcolm McGee on the UPN sitcom Malcolm & Eddie, and Dr. Alex Reed in the sitcom Reed Between the Lines.

Warner also became an executive producer for the PBS Kids series The Magic School Bus, which is also produced by Nelvana, Scholastic, and South Carolina Educational Television. In 2015, he received a Grammy Award for Best Traditional R&B Performance for the song "Jesus Children" alongside Robert Glasper Experiment and Lalah Hathaway. He later appeared as Al Cowlings on the FX limited series The People v. O. J. Simpson: American Crime Story. Warner currently plays Dr. AJ Austin on the FOX medical drama The Resident.

Early life 
Warner was born in Jersey City, New Jersey. He was raised by his divorced mother, Pamela, who served as his manager. He was named for Malcolm X and jazz pianist Ahmad Jamal. At the age of nine, he demonstrated an interest in show business which led to enrollment in acting schools. His career as a child performer later led him to graduate high school from The Professional Children's School in New York City, New York.

Career 
With appearances and roles on many television shows and films, he landed his most successful role as Theo Huxtable, the only son of Heathcliff Huxtable, who was played by Bill Cosby on the NBC sitcom, The Cosby Show from 1984 to 1992. Warner auditioned for the role on the final day of the nationwide search and was chosen by Cosby himself.

During his tenure on The Cosby Show Warner turned his hand to directing, making music videos including New Edition's "N.E. Heart Break" (1989), rapper Special Ed's "I'm the Magnificent" (1989), and British R&B group Five Star's "I Love You For Sentimental Reasons" (1994). He has directed episodes of many sitcoms, including The Cosby Show, All That, Kenan & Kel, and Malcolm & Eddie. In addition, Warner directed the acclaimed, teen-oriented public health video Time Out: The Truth About HIV, AIDS, and You (1992), which featured Arsenio Hall and Earvin "Magic" Johnson discussing the realities of HIV and AIDS and the best ways to prevent its spread.

He went on to star in Jeremiah, was the voice of The Producer character on The Magic School Bus and co-starred with comedian Eddie Griffin for four years on the UPN sitcom Malcolm & Eddie. Warner continued his career on the CBS sitcom Listen Up! with Jason Alexander and was the host of the literacy-promoting children's show CBS Storybreak. He guest-starred on an episode of The Fresh Prince of Bel-Air playing the role of Hilary's boyfriend. In 1995, Warner appeared as a homeless man on Touched by an Angel.

In 2003, Warner released his debut EP, The Miles Long Mixtape. In 2007, Warner followed up with his second CD entitled Love & Other Social Issues. In 2009 he guest starred in an episode in the new TNT series HawthoRNe. In 2011 and 2012, he guest starred in four episodes of the NBC series Community as Andre, the ex-husband of Shirley Bennett (Yvette Nicole Brown). His character subtly referenced his Cosby Show past by wearing a "Cosby  sweater" that he stated was from his dad.

He is a bass guitar player and a performance poet, and has performed at the National Black Theatre Festival since 2003, in addition to hosting its Poetry Jam.

Warner has co-starred in BET's scripted comedic television series Reed Between the Lines. He played the role of Alex Reed, an English professor married to Carla Reed, a psychologist played by former Girlfriends star Tracee Ellis Ross. The couple had three children: Kaci and Kenan Reynolds, Carla's children from a previous relationship, and Alexis Reed, their child together. The show highlighted the couple's ups and downs together as a blended family. In 2012 Warner was nominated for Outstanding Actor in a comedy series at the NAACP Image awards for his role in Reed Between the Lines. In the spring of 2015, it was announced that Warner would be playing the part of Al Cowlings in the crime series American Crime Story, based on the events of the O.J. Simpson trial.

Warner portrays recurring characters on multiple current TV series. He played prison counselor Julius Rowe on the sixth season of USA network's Suits. On the TNT series Major Crimes he portrays Lt. Chuck Cooper, a member of the LAPD's Special Investigation's Section (SIS) and the love interest of the Major Crime Division's Detective Amy Sykes. He also plays the role of parole officer James Bagwell on Amazon Prime's show Sneaky Pete and as Dr. AJ “The Raptor” Austin on The Resident [FOX].

Personal life 
Warner had a relationship with actress Michelle Thomas, who portrayed his girlfriend Justine Phillips on The Cosby Show, until 1994 and was at her bedside when she died in 1998. He was in a relationship with actress Karen Malina White for seven and a half years. Warner also dated actress Regina King from 2011 until March 2013. He is married with a daughter, and has not disclosed his wife's or their child's name publicly citing privacy concerns.

Filmography

Film

Television

Discography 
The Miles Long Mixtape (2003)
Love & Other Social Issues (2007)
Selfless (2015)
Hiding In Plain View (2022)

Awards and nominations 
Grammy Awards
2015: Won, "Best Traditional R&B Performance" – "Jesus Children" (with Robert Glasper Experiment featuring Lalah Hathaway)
2022: Nominated, "Best Spoken Word Poetry Album" - Hiding In Plain View

MD Theatre Guide Readers' Choice Awards
2013: Winner 1st Place, "Best Performance by Lead Actor in a Play" -Doctor John Prentice in Guess Who's Coming to Dinner at Arena Stage

BET Comedy Awards
2005: Nominated, "Outstanding Supporting Actor in a Comedy Series" — Listen Up

Emmy Awards
1986: Nominated, "Outstanding Supporting Actor in a Comedy Series" — The Cosby Show

Image Awards
1996: Nominated, "Outstanding Supporting Actor in a Drama Series" — Touched by an Angel
2001: Nominated, "Outstanding Actor in a Comedy Series" — Malcolm & Eddie
2012: Won, "Outstanding Actor in a Comedy Series" – Reed Between the Lines

TV Land Awards
2006: Nominated, "Favorite Singing Siblings" — The Cosby Show (shared w/co-stars)

Young Artist Award
1985: Won, Best Young Supporting Actor in a Television Comedy Series – The Cosby Show
1988: Nominated, Best Young Male Superstar in Television – The Cosby Show
1989: Won, Best Young Actor/Actress Ensemble in a Television Comedy, Drama Series or Special – The Cosby Show (shared w/co-stars)
1990: Won, "Best Young Actor Supporting Role in a Television Series" — The Cosby Show

Books 
Theo and Me: Growing up Okay (1988) -  (with Daniel Paisner)

References

External links 

Malcolm-Jamal Warner Official Website
Malcolm-Jamal Warner's Twitter Official Twitter

1970 births
Living people
American male child actors
African-American male actors
African-American television directors
American television directors
American male film actors
Male actors from Jersey City, New Jersey
American male television actors
20th-century American male actors
21st-century American male actors
Grammy Award winners
CBS Storybreak
African-American male child actors
20th-century African-American people
21st-century African-American people